The Ilyushin Il-2 (Russian: Илью́шин Ил-2) is a ground-attack plane that was produced by the Soviet Union in large numbers during the Second World War. The word shturmovík (Cyrillic: штурмовик), the generic Russian term for a ground-attack aircraft, became a synecdoche for the Il-2 in English sources, where it is commonly rendered Shturmovik, Stormovik and Sturmovik. 

To Il-2 pilots, the aircraft was known by the diminutive "Ilyusha". To the soldiers on the ground, it was called the "Hunchback", the "Flying Tank" or the "Flying Infantryman". Its postwar NATO reporting name was Bark.  

During the war, 36,183 units of the Il-2 were produced, and in combination with its successor, the Ilyushin Il-10, a total of 42,330 were built, making it the single most produced military aircraft design in aviation history, as well as one of the most produced piloted aircraft in history along with the American postwar civilian Cessna 172 and the German then-contemporary Messerschmitt Bf 109. 

The Il-2 played a crucial role on the Eastern Front. When factories fell behind on deliveries, Joseph Stalin told the factory managers that the Il-2s were "as essential to the Red Army as air and bread."

Design and development

Origins

The idea for a Soviet armored ground-attack aircraft dates to the early 1930s, when Dmitry Pavlovich Grigorovich designed TSh-1 and TSh-2 armored biplanes. However, Soviet engines at the time lacked the power needed to provide the heavy aircraft with good performance. The Il-2 was designed by Sergey Ilyushin and his team at the Central Design Bureau in 1938. TsKB-55 was a two-seat aircraft with an armoured shell weighing , protecting crew, engine, radiators, and the fuel tank. Uniquely for a World War II attack aircraft, and similarly to the forward fuselage design of the World War I-era Imperial German Junkers J.I armored, all-metal biplane, the Il-2's armor was designed as a load-bearing part of the Ilyushin's monocoque structure, thus saving considerable weight. The prototype TsKB-55, which first flew on 2 October 1939, won the government competition against the Sukhoi Su-6 and received the VVS designation BSh-2 (the BSh stood for "Bronirovani Shturmovik" or armoured ground attack). The prototypes – TsKB-55 and TskB-57 – were built at Moscow plant #39, at that time the Ilyushin design bureau's base.

The BSh-2 was overweight and underpowered, with the original Mikulin AM-35  engine designed to give its greatest power outputs at high altitude. Because of this it was redesigned as the TsKB-57, a lighter single-seat design, with the more powerful  Mikulin AM-38 engine, a development of the AM-35 optimised for low level operation. The TsKB-57 first flew on 12 October 1940. The production aircraft passed State Acceptance Trials in March 1941, and was redesignated Il-2 in April. Deliveries to operational units commenced in May 1941.

The  armament of Il-2 was subject to a competition. One of the first 1940 photographs of the Il-2 show it equipped with two MP-6 23 mm autocannons developed by Yakov Taubin (Яков Таубин) at OKB-16. It operated on the short recoil principle and had a rate of fire of about 600 rpm. (The development of the MP-6 gun can be traced back to 1937. The initial version was tested in the spring of 1940 on a Bf 110 bought from Germany, because there was no suitable Soviet aircraft on which to mount it. In the summer of 1940 it was tested on the Pashinin I-21.) Factory trials of the MP-6 gun on the Il-2 were conducted in August 1940. In the early Il-2 prototypes, these guns were fed by 81-round clips. In flight, these clips sometimes became dislodged because of their large surface, which caused them to experience significant aerodynamic pressure. Competitive tests were conducted in the spring of 1941 between the MP-6 gun modified to belt-fed and the newly developed, gas-operated Volkov-Yartsev VYa-23, which had otherwise rather similar characteristics. The VYa-23 was declared the winner at this trial. Subsequently, in May 1941, development of the MP-6 gun was terminated and Taubin was arrested and summarily executed in October that year.

Technical description
The Il-2 is a single-engine, propeller-driven, low-wing monoplane of mixed construction with a crew of two (one in early versions), specially designed for assault operations. Its most notable feature was the inclusion of armor in an airframe load-bearing scheme. Armor plates replaced the frame and paneling throughout the nacelle and middle part of the fuselage, and an armored hull made of riveted homogeneous armor steel AB-1 (AB-2) secured the aircraft's engine, cockpit, water and oil radiators, and fuel tanks.

Production
In early 1941, the Il-2 was ordered into production at four factories, and was eventually produced in greater numbers than any other military aircraft in aviation history, but by the time Nazi Germany invaded the Soviet Union on 22 June 1941, only State Aviation Factory 18 at Voronezh and Factory 381 at Leningrad had commenced production, with 249 having been built by the time of the German attack.

Production early in the war was slow because after the German invasion the aircraft factories near Moscow and other major cities in western Russia had to be moved east of the Ural Mountains. Ilyushin and his engineers had time to reconsider production methods, and two months after the move Il-2s were again being produced. The tempo was not to Premier Stalin's liking, however, and he issued the following telegram to Shenkman and Tretyakov:

As a result, "the production of Shturmoviks rapidly gained speed. Stalin's notion of the Il-2 being 'like bread' to the Red Army took hold in Ilyushin's aircraft plants and the army soon had their Shturmoviks available in quantity."

Operational history

Initial use and operational confusion
The first use in action of the Il-2 was with the 4th ShAP (Ground Attack Regiment) over the Berezina River days after German invasion began. The aircraft was so new that the pilots had no training in flight characteristics or tactics, and the ground crew no training in servicing or re-arming. The training received enabled the pilots only to take-off and land; none of the pilots had fired the armament, let alone learned tactics. There were 249 Il-2s available on 22 June 1941. In the first three days, 4th ShAP had lost 10 Il-2s to enemy action, a further 19 were lost to other causes, and 20 pilots were killed.
By 10 July, 4th ShAP was down to 10 aircraft from a strength of 65.

New tactics
Tactics improved as Soviet aircrews became used to the Il-2's strengths. Instead of a low horizontal straight approach at  altitude, the target was usually kept to the pilot's left and a turn and shallow dive of 30 degrees was used, using an echeloned assault by four to twelve aircraft at a time. Although the Il-2's RS-82 and RS-132 rockets could destroy armored vehicles with one hit, they were so inaccurate that experienced Il-2 pilots mainly used the cannon. Another potent weapon of the Il-2 were high-explosive anti-tank (HEAT) shaped charge bomblets named protivotankovaya aviabomba (PTAB, "anti-tank aviation bomb"). Up to 192 were carried in four external dispensers (cluster bombs) or up to 220 in the inner wing panels' internal ventral weapon bays. The charge could easily penetrate the relatively thin upper armor of all heavy German tanks. PTABs were first used on a large scale in the Battle of Kursk.

The Il-2 was thereafter deployed widely on the Eastern Front. The aircraft could fly in low light conditions and carried weapons able to defeat the thick armor of the Panther and Tiger I tanks.

Effectiveness as attack aircraft

The true capabilities of the Il-2 are difficult to determine from existing documentary evidence. W. Liss in Aircraft profile 88: Ilyushin Il-2 mentions an engagement during the Battle of Kursk on 7 July 1943, in which 70 tanks from the German 9th Panzer Division were claimed to be destroyed by Ilyushin Il-2s in just 20 minutes. In another report of the action on the same day, a Soviet staff publication states that:

In the Battle of Kursk (Operation Citadel), General V. Ryazanov became a master in the use of attack aircraft en masse, developing and improving the tactics of Il-2 operations in co-ordination with infantry, artillery and armored troops. Il-2s at Kursk used the "circle of death" tactic: up to eight Shturmoviks formed a defensive circle, each plane protecting the one ahead with its forward machine guns, while individual Il-2s took turns leaving the circle, attacking a target, and rejoining the circle. Ryazanov was later awarded the Gold Star of Hero of Soviet Union twice, and the 1st Assault Aviation Corps under his command became the first unit to be awarded the honorific title of Guards.
In 1943, one loss corresponded to 26 Shturmovik sorties. About half of those lost were shot down by fighters, the rest falling to anti-aircraft fire.

Other studies of the fighting at Kursk suggest that very few of German armour losses were caused by the IL-2 or any other Soviet aircraft. In fact, total German tank losses in Operation Citadel amounted to 323 totally destroyed, the vast majority to anti-tank guns and armored fighting vehicles. In addition it is difficult to find any first-hand accounts by German panzer crews on the Eastern Front describing anything more than the occasional loss to direct air attack. The vast majority, around 95–98%, of tank losses were due to enemy anti-tank guns, tanks, mines, artillery, and infantry assault, or simply abandoned as operational losses (such as mechanical breakdown or running out of fuel), which mostly happened during the last eleven months of the war.

During the Battle of Kursk,  VVS Il-2s claimed the destruction of no less than 270 tanks (and 2,000 men) in a period of just two hours against the 3rd Panzer Division. On 1 July, however, the 3rd Panzer Division's 6th Panzer Regiment had just 90 tanks, 180 less than claimed as destroyed.  On 11 July (well after the battle), the 3rd Panzer Division still had 41 operational tanks.  The 3rd Panzer Division continued fighting throughout July, mostly with 48th Panzer Corps. It did not record any extraordinary losses to air attack throughout this period. As with the other panzer divisions at Kursk, the large majority of the 3rd Panzer Division's tank losses were due to dug-in Soviet anti-tank guns and tanks.

Perhaps the most extraordinary claim by the VVS's Il-2s is that, over a period of four hours, they destroyed 240 tanks and in the process virtually wiped out the 17th Panzer Division. On 1 July, the 17th Panzer Division had only one tank battalion (the II./Pz Rgt 39), with 67 tanks, 173 less than claimed destroyed by the VVS. The 17th Panzer Division was not even in the main attack sector, but further south with the 1st Panzer Army's 24th Panzer Corps. The 17th Panzer did not register any abnormal losses due to aircraft in the summer of 1943, and retreated westwards with Army Group South later in the year, still intact.

The main problem with the Il-2 was the inaccuracy of its attacks. Towards the end of war, the Soviets were able to concentrate large numbers of Shturmoviks to support their main offensives. The effect, however, was often more psychological than actual physical destruction of targets, particularly against dug-in and armored targets. In the 9 June offensive in the Karelian Isthmus in Finland, the Finnish anti-aircraft forces were far too few in number to counter the armadas of Pe-2 and Il-2, but they quickly found that the Il-2 attacks generally missed their marks widely, particularly with bombs. While some attacks against large unprotected targets such as horse and truck convoys and railyards had devastating results, attacks against dug-in point targets were usually ineffective. The frequent duels between dug-in 20 and 40 mm AA guns and Il-2 attackers never resulted in the complete destruction of the gun, while many Il-2s were brought down in these attacks.

The heavy armor of the Il-2 also meant that it would typically carry only comparatively light bomb-loads, which together with the poor accuracy of its attacks made it a far less deadly attack aircraft than contemporary Allied fighter-bombers such as the Republic P-47 Thunderbolt and Hawker Typhoon. Likewise, the Shturmovik's bombs were usually only , or rarely , too small to compensate for the typically wide variation from the target point.
To compensate for the poor accuracy of the Il-2's bombsight, in 1943, the Soviet Command decided to use shaped-charge armor-piercing projectiles against enemy armored vehicles, and the PTAB-2.5-1.5 SCAP aircraft bomb was put into production.
Pilots of 291st ShAP were the first to use the PTAB-2.5-1.5 bombs. During one sortie on 5 June 1943, six attack aircraft led by Lt. Col. A. Vitrook destroyed 15 enemy tanks in one attack, and during five days of the enemy advance, the 291st Division claimed to have destroyed or damaged 422 enemy tanks.

"The Flying tank"
Thanks to the heavy armor protection, the Il-2 could take a great deal of punishment and proved difficult for both ground and aircraft fire to shoot down.

A major threat to the Il-2 was German ground fire. In postwar interviews, Il-2 pilots reported  and  artillery as the primary threat.   While the fabled  calibre gun was formidable, low-flying Il-2s presented too fast-moving a target for the 88's relatively low rate of fire, only occasional hits were scored. Similarly, Finnish attempts to counter the Il-2 during the summer of 1944 proved ineffective as a result of the low numbers of  AA in the field army. Heavier  guns drawn from homeland defence proved also relatively ineffective and few Il-2s were downed despite attempting different tactics with time-fused fragmentation, contact-fused, and shrapnel ammunition: the heavy guns simply lacked the reaction times to take advantage of the brief firing opportunities presented by the low-altitude Il-2 attacks.  Single-barrel 20 mm anti-aircraft guns were also found somewhat inadequate due to limited firepower: one or two shells were often not enough to destroy the Il-2, and unless the Il-2 was attacking the gun itself, thus presenting effectively a stationary target, scoring more hits during a firing opportunity was rare. 

The armored tub, ranging from  thickness and enveloping the engine and the cockpit, could deflect all small arms fire and glancing blows from larger-caliber ammunition. Unfortunately the rear gunners did not have the benefit of all-around armor protection, especially from the rear and to the sides, and suffered about four times the casualties of pilots. Added casualties resulted from the Soviet policy of not returning home with unused ammunition which typically resulted in repeated passes on the target. Soviet troops often requested additional passes even after the aircraft were out of ammunition to exploit the intimidating effect Il-2s had on German ground troops, who gave it the nickname "The Flying Tank". It was also called "Black Death" by German troops. Luftwaffe pilots called it Zementbomber (Concrete bomber). The Finnish nickname maatalouskone ("agricultural machine" or "tractor") derived from a word play with maataistelukone (ground attack aircraft, literally "ground combat aircraft" where kone, literally "machine", in turn is shortened from lentokone, aircraft, literally "flying machine")

Rear gunner

Heavy losses to enemy fighters forced the reintroduction of a rear gunner; early Il-2s were field modified by cutting a hole in the fuselage behind the cockpit for a gunner sitting on a canvas sling armed with a  UBT machine gun in an improvised mounting. The semi-turret gun mount allowed the machine gun to be fired at angles of up to 35° upwards, 35° to starboard and 15° to port. At the beginning of March 1942, a production two-seat Il-2 with the new gunner's cockpit began manufacturer tests. The second cockpit and armament increased all-up weight by  so the flaps were allowed to be deployed at an angle of 17° to avoid an over-long takeoff run. The new variant had a lengthened fuselage compartment with an extended canopy offering some protection from the elements.

To improve performance, the Mikulin Design Bureau started work on an uprated AM-38 engine. They gave an improved takeoff and low-altitude performance. On 30 October 1942, production Il-2s powered by AM38s were used on the Central Front for the first time when they successfully attacked Smolensk airfield occupied by Germans. The Shturmovik rear guns proved to be effective against hostile fighters, and during the service trials alone, gunners shot down seven Bf 109s and repulsed many attacks. In January 1943 two-seat attack aircraft powered by uprated AM-38F engines (Forseerovannyy – uprated) began to arrive at front line units.

Nonetheless, the death rate among the air gunners remained exceptionally high and it was only for late models produced after 1944 that the  rear plate of the armour shell was moved rearwards into the (wooden) rear fuselage to allow a gunner to sit behind the fuel tank. The armour did not extend to the rear or below although side armour panels were riveted to the rear armour plate to protect the ammunition tank for the UBT machine gun, providing some measure of protection. The modifications including adding the rear gunner and gun had added weight behind the center of gravity, resulting in "marginal" stability and handling characteristics that were "barely acceptable". The need to shift the aerodynamic center of the aircraft rearwards due to the weight of the added rear gunner and lengthened cockpit was the reason for the swept back outer wings in later Il-2s.

Air-to-air combat
Owing to a shortage of fighters, in 1941–1942, Il-2s were occasionally used as fighters.  While outclassed by dedicated fighters such as the Messerschmitt Bf 109 and Focke-Wulf Fw 190, in dogfights, the Il-2 could take on other Luftwaffe aircraft with some success.  German front line units equipped with the Henschel Hs 126 suffered most of all from the ravages of Il-2s. Il-2 pilots also often attacked close formations of Junkers Ju 87s, as the  machine guns of the Ju 87 Stukas were ineffective against the heavily armoured Shturmoviks. In the winter of 1941–1942, Il-2s were used against Luftwaffe transport aircraft, and became the most dangerous opponent of the Junkers Ju 52/3m. Pilots of 33rd GvShAP were the most successful in these operations. Other successful units were those in 1942–1943 operating near Stalingrad. Their targets were not only Ju 52s but also Heinkel He 111 and Focke-Wulf Fw 200 Condor bombers, delivering supplies to the besieged German troops.

While the Il-2 was a deadly air-to-ground weapon, and even a fairly effective interceptor against slow bombers and transport aircraft, heavy losses resulted from its vulnerability to fighter attack. Losses were very high, the highest of all types of Soviet aircraft, though given the numbers in service this is only to be expected. Shturmovik losses (including Il-10 type), in 1941–1945, were of 10,762 aircraft (533 in 1941, 1,676 in 1942,  3,515 in 1943, 3,347 in 1944 and 1,691 in 1945). The main defensive tactic was to fly low and reduce power as the fighter closed in. This could make the fighter overshoot and fly into the Il-2's firing zone.

During the Battle in Karelian Isthmus, Vyborg Offensive in summer 1944, Finnish 24th and 34th Fighter Squadrons and Luftwaffe II./JG 54 took a toll on Soviet Il-2 squadrons. In just 30 days (10 June – 9 July) Finnish and German fighter pilots shot down 111 and 53 Il-2s respectively.

Notable aircrew
Senior Lieutenant Anna Yegorova piloted 243 Il-2 missions and was decorated three times. One of these awards was the Gold Star of Hero of the Soviet Union that she had received "posthumously" in late 1944, since she was presumed dead after being shot down. She survived imprisonment in a German POW camp.

Guards Junior Lieutenant Ivan Drachenko, another Il-2 pilot, was one of only four men who was awarded the title Hero of the Soviet Union and who was also a Full Cavalier of the Order of Glory as a recipient of each of the Order of Glory's three classes.  Despite having lost his right eye as a result of injuries sustained in a combat mission on August 14, 1943, he returned to flying status and continued to fly combat sorties until war's end.

Recipient of the "Hero of the Soviet Union", T. Kuznetsov, survived the crash of his Il-2 in 1942 when shot down returning from a reconnaissance mission. Kuznetsov escaped from the wreck and hid nearby. To his surprise, a German Bf 109 fighter landed near the crash site and the pilot began to investigate the wrecked Il-2, possibly to look for souvenirs. Thinking quickly, Kuznetsov ran to the German fighter and used it to fly home, barely avoiding being shot down by Soviet fighters in the process.

Lietenant Colonel Nelson Stepanyan flew an Il-2 and took part in a number of aerial battles and bombing sorties. He was shot down once but did return to the Soviet lines. On his final sortie in Liepāja, Latvia on 14 December 1944, his plane was hit by anti-aircraft fire, and although wounded, he flew his airplane into a German warship. Soviet sources assert that Stepanyan flew no fewer than 239 combat sorties, sank 53 ships, thirteen of which he did alone, destroyed 80 tanks, 600 armored vehicles, and 27 aircraft.

The cosmonaut Georgy Beregovoy flew the Ilyushin in 185 sorties, and was awarded the "Hero of the Soviet Union" in 1944. Later, he became the earliest-born cosmonaut and the only cosmonaut to be awarded a "Hero of the Soviet Union" for an earlier achievement that was not related to space travel.

Variants
The early two-seater prototype proved to be too heavy for the limited power of the early Mikulin AM-35 engine. A redesigned single-seat version was soon developed and saw combat, particularly in the early phase of the war in the Soviet Union. While the Il-2 proved to be a deadly air-to-ground weapon, heavy losses were caused by its vulnerability to fighter attack. Consequently, in February 1942, the two-seat design was revived. The Il-2M, with a rear gunner under the stretched canopy, entered service in September 1942 with the surviving single-seaters eventually modified to this standard. In 1943, the Il-2 Type 3 or Il-2m3 came out with redesigned "arrow-wings" that possessed leading edges that were swept back 15 degrees on the outer panels, and nearly straight trailing edges, resulting in a wing planform somewhat like the AT-6 trainer. Performance and handling were much improved from the resulting shift of the Il-2's aerodynamic center rearwards with the revised "arrow wing" planform to correct the earlier problem, and this became the most common version of the Il-2. A radial engine powered variant of the Il-2 with the Shvetsov ASh-82 engine was proposed in 1942 to remedy projected shortages in the Mikulin inline engines. However, the Shvetsov ASh-82 was also used in the new Lavochkin La-5 fighter which effectively secured all available engines to the Lavochkin bureau. The radial engine Sukhoi Su-2 ground attack aircraft was produced in small quantities, but was generally considered unsuitable due to inadequate performance and lack of defensive armament.

TsKB-55
Two-seat prototype, AM-35 engine, first flight on 2 October 1939.
BSh-2
VVS designation for TsKB-55 prototype.
TsKB-57
Single-seat prototype, AM-38 engine, first flight on 12 October 1940.
Il-2 (TsKB-57P)
Single-seat serial aircraft, AM-38 engine, first flight on 29 December 1940, some delivered to combat units in May–June 1941. Renamed the Il-2 in April 1941. Cannons 20 mm ShVAK or 23 mm VYa-23 (depending on which factory the Il-2 was manufactured in).
Il-2 two-seat
Two-seat version, AM-38 engine, first action on 30 October 1942 near Stalingrad. Used on edges of flight formations for defense against German fighters. Quickly replaced by the "Il-2 production of 1943".
Il-2 production of 1943
Referred in the west as the "Il-2M". Powered by an upgraded AM-38F engine. Delivered to the front units from early 1943. In 1943, the 20 mm ShVAK armed Il-2s faded out, leaving only the 23 mm VYa variant.

Il-2 with NS-37
Referred in the west as the "Il-2 Type 3M". Based on the two-seat Il-2, armed with Nudelman-Suranov NS-37 in conformal gun pods under the wings, instead of the 20/23 mm cannons, this version is an attempt to create an anti-tank aircraft, first used in combat during the Battle of Kursk. However, the combat effectiveness was quite low and production of the variant was limited to about 3,500. It was replaced by the conventional Il-2 attackers armed with cassettes with cumulative bomblets.
Il-2 production 1944 "wing with arrow"
Referred in West as "Il-2M3" or "Il-2 Type 3". As more duralumin became available for the Soviet aviation industry, the Il-2 received a set of all-metal wing panels. At the same time, the outer wing planform was swept back, with a straight trailing edge, since the centre of gravity was shifted rearwards after the gunner was added. The wing planform change regained controllability of the two-seat Il-2 back to level of the single-seat Il-2.
Il-2U
Training version, also known as UIl-2.
Il-2T
Torpedo bomber version for the Soviet Navy with the VYa-23 cannons removed to save weight, it was able to carry a single  torpedo. Evidently, it was only a design as the 23rd Attack Air Regiment of the Black Sea Fleet flew regular Il-2M-3s fitted with torpedo racks as a field modification, and that no such aircraft were ever noted in the battle sortie logs.
Il-2I
Armoured fighter, prototype only. Concept based on several dogfights between Il-2 and Luftwaffe bombers. Proved infeasible due to its low speed, which causes it to be able to intercept only older Luftwaffe bombers.
Il-2 with M-82
A backup project prepared while plants producing AM-35/AM-38 were evacuated. Trials demonstrated that with the fighter engine, low-altitude performance and controllability were unacceptable.

Military operators

 People's Republic of Bulgaria
 Bulgarian Air Force – received 120 Il-2 and 10 training Il-2U in 1945. The type was operated between 1945 and 1954.

Hungarian Air Force – received an unknown number of aircraft. The type was operated from 1945 to 1952.
 Mongolian People's Republic
Mongolian People's Army Aviation – received 71 Il-2 in 1945. The type was operated between 1945 and 1954

 Czechoslovakian Air Force – received 33 Il-2 and 2 training Il-2U aircraft. This type was operated between 1944 and 1949.

 Air Force of the Polish Army – (after 1947 Polish Air Force) received about 230 Il-2 aircraft between 1944 and 1946. All were retired in 1949.

 Soviet Air Force
 Soviet Naval Aviation

 SFR Yugoslav Air Force – received 213 aircraft in Il-2M3 and UIl-2 versions and used them until 1954. Used by:
421st Assault Aviation Regiment (1944–1948)
554th Assault Aviation Regiment (1945–1948)
422nd Assault Aviation Regiment (1944–1948)
423rd Assault Aviation Regiment (1944–1948)
3rd Training Aviation Regiment (1945–1948)
81st Assault Aviation Regiment (1948–1953)
96th Assault Aviation Regiment (1948–1954)
107th Assault Aviation Regiment (1948–1953)
111th Assault Aviation Regiment (1948–1952)
185th Mixed Aviation Regiment (1949–1952)

Surviving aircraft

Bulgaria
On display
Il-2m3
 S/N unknown - at the National Aviation Museum in Krumovo, Plovdiv.

Czech Republic
On display
Il-2m3
 12438 – at the Kbely Aviation Museum in Kbely, Prague.

Hungary
On display
Il-2
 S/N unknown - unrestored at the Airplane Museum of Szolnok in Szolnok, Jász-Nagykun-Szolnok. Recovered from a lake. Engine #259059.

Norway
On display
Il-2m3

 3035560 – at the Grenselandsmuseet in Kirkenes, Troms og Finnmark. It was recovered from a lake on the Norwegian side of the border in 1985 and restored in Russia.

Poland
On display
Il-2m3

 21 - at the Museum of the Polish Army in Warsaw, Mazovia. It was used by the 3rd Assault Aviation Regiment (3 Pułk Lotnictwa Szturmowego).

Russia
Airworthy
Il-2
 1872452 – Airworthy with the Wings of Victory Foundation in Moscow. It was recovered in 2015 from the bottom of a lake near Murmansk and restored by Aviarestoration on a commission from UAC.
On display
Il-2
 2440 – displayed in Novorossiysk, Krasnodar Krai.

 7826 - (forward fuselage only) displayed unrestored at Patriot Park in Kubinka, Moscow Oblast.  The aircraft was reportedly shot down in the Kerch Strait on 1 November 1943, and was subsequently recovered in 2015.
 S/N unknown - displayed in Dubna, Moscow. It was recovered locally.
 S/N unknown - displayed in Lebyazhye, Leningrad.
 S/N unknown - displayed in a traffic circle in Samara. This particular plane was shot down in 1943 over Karelia, but the heavily wounded pilot, K. Kotlyarovsky, managed to crash-land the plane near Lake Oriyarvi. The aircraft was returned to Kuybyshev in 1975.
 S/N unknown - displayed at the UMMC Museum Complex in Verkhnyaya Pyshma, Sverdlovsk.
Il-2m3

 301060 – Il-2m3 on static display at the Central Air Force Museum in Monino, Moscow.
Under restoration or in storage
Il-2
 1870930 - Under restoration to airworthy condition by the Wings of Victory Foundation in Moscow. It is the only surviving single-seat Il-2 built before 1942.

Serbia
On display
Il-2m3
 308831 – at the Aeronautical Museum Belgrade in Surčin, Belgrade.

United Kingdom
Under restoration or in storage
Il-2
 1878576 - in storage at Wickenby, Lincolnshire, England.
Il-2m3
 1870710 - under restoration for display at Wickenby, Lincolnshire, England for Royal Air Force Museum London.

United States
Airworthy
Il-2m3

 305401 – at the Flying Heritage & Combat Armor Museum in Everett, Washington. It incorporates parts of four different wrecked aircraft recovered from Russia and was restored by Retro Avia Tech with a reversed Allison V-1710-113.
On display
Il-2
 5612 – Il-2 on static display at the Pima Air & Space Museum in Tucson, Arizona.
Under restoration or in storage
Il-2
 Composite – in storage at the Paul E. Garber Preservation, Restoration, and Storage Facility of the National Air and Space Museum in Suitland, Maryland.

Specifications (Il-2M3)

See also

References

Notes

Bibliography
 Bergström, Christer. Bagration to Berlin: The final Air Battle in the East 1944–45. Hersham UK, Classic Publications, 2008. .
 Bergström, Christer. Barbarossa: The Air Battle: July–December 1941. London: Chevron/Ian Allan, 2007. .
 Crosby, Francis.  The Complete Guide to Fighters and Bombers of WWII. London: Anness Publishing Ltd: Hermes House, 2006. .
 Donald, Donald and Jon Lake, eds. Encyclopedia of World Military Aircraft. London: AIRtime Publishing, 1996. .
 Empric, Bruce E. Onward to Berlin!:  Red Army Valor in World War II - The Full Cavaliers of the Soviet Order of Glory. Seattle: Teufelsberg Press, 2017. .
 Glantz, David M. and Jonathan M. House. The Battle of Kursk. London: Ian Allan Publishing Ltd, Surrey, UK, 1999. .
 Glantz, David M. and Harold S. Orenstein. The Battle for Kursk 1943: The Soviet General Staff Study. London: Frank Cass, 1999. .
 Gordon, Yefim, Dmitry Komissarov and Sergei Komissarov. OKB Ilyushin: A History of the Design Bureau and its Aircraft. Hinckley, Leicestershire, UK: Midland Publishing, 2004. .
 Gordon, Yefim and Sergey Kommissarov. Ilyushin IL-2 and IL-10 Shturmovik. Wiltshire: Crowood Press, 2004. .
 Gordon, Yefim. Soviet Airpower in World War II. Hinckley UK: Midland / Ian Allan Publishing, 2008. .
 Green, William and Gordon Swanborough. "The Annals of Ilyusha: Ilyushin's Proliferous Shturmovik". Air Enthusiast, Issue Twelve, April–July 1980, pp. 1–10, 71–77. Bromley, Kent, UK: Pilot Press. ISSN 0143-5450.
 Gunston, Bill. The Osprey Encyclopedia of Russian Aircraft 1875–1995. London: Osprey, 1995. .
 Hardesty, Von. Red Phoenix: The Rise of Soviet Air Power, 1941–1945. Washington, D.C.: Smithsonian Books, 1982. .
 Jentz, T. L. Panzer Truppen, The Complete Guide to the Creation and Combat Deployment of Germany’s Tank Force: 1943–1945. Atglen, Pennsylvania: Schiffer Military History, 1996. .
 Krivosheev, G.F. Soviet Casualties and Combat Losses in the Twentieth Century. London: Greenhill Books, 1997. .
 Liss, Witold. Ilyushin Il-2 (Aircraft in Profile number 88). Leatherhead, Surrey, UK: Profile Publications Ltd., 1968. No ISBN. Reprinted in 1971 and 1982.
 Ludeke, Alexander. Weapons of World War II. Bath, UK: Parragon Books Ltd., 2012. .
 Michulec, Robert. Ił-2 Ił-10. Monografie Lotnicze #22 (in Polish). Gdańsk: AJ-Press, 1999. .
 Ovčáčík, Michal and Karel Susa.  Ilyushin Il-2 Shturmovik: Il-2 Type 3, Il-2 Type 3M, Il-2KR, UIl-2. Prague, Czech Republic: 4+ Publications, 2006. .
 Povinsky, Viktor. Il-2 Shturmovik. Sandomierz, Poland/Redbourn, UK: Mushroom Model Publications, 2014. .
 Шавров, В.Б. История конструкций самолетов в СССР 1938–1950 гг. (3 изд.). (in Russisn) Moscow: Машиностроение, 1994. . (Shavrov, V.B. Istoriia konstruktskii samoletov v SSSR, 1938–1950 gg. (3rd ed.). translation: History of Aircraft design in USSR: 1938–1950. Moscow: Mashinostroenie Publishing House, 1994. .)
 Rastrenin, Oleg. IL-2 Sturmovik Guards Units of World War 2 (Osprey Combat Aircraft, no 71). Oxford, UK: Osprey Publishing, 2008. .
 Sakaida, Henry. Heroines of the Soviet Union: 1941–45. Oxford, UK: Osprey Publishing, 2003. .
 Shores, Christopher. Ground Attack Aircraft of World War II. London: Macdonald and Jane's, 1977. .
 Stapfer, Hans-Heiri. Il-2 Stormovik in Action (Aircraft number 155). Carrollton, TX: Squadron/Signal Publications, Inc., 1995. .

External links

 How to fly Il-2. Training Film by the Red Army Air Force Research Institute, 1943. English subtitles
 25 shots of Il-2 memorial (Novorossyisk, Russia)
 Interview with Il-2 pilot Yuri Khukhrikov
 First public flight of the Flying Heritage Collection's Il-2, with P-47 Thunderbolt chase plane

Anti-tank aircraft
Il-002
1940s Soviet attack aircraft
World War II Soviet ground attack aircraft
Single-engined tractor aircraft
Low-wing aircraft
Aircraft first flown in 1939